Jaakko Salovaara (born 13 January 1975), better known by his stage name JS16, is a Finnish musician, DJ and record producer. He is best known for his work with Finnish hip hop group Bomfunk MC's, producing their most successful song "Freestyler", and for his work with Finnish DJ and producer Darude, as well as other solo productions and remixes. He released his debut studio album, Stomping System in 1998. He is part of the DJ duo Dallas Superstars with Heikki L, and owns the dance music record label 16 Inch Records.

Career
His first release was the 1991 single "Hypnosynthesis", at the age of 16 (hence the number 16 in his artist name). With the release of the club/dance music album Stomping System in 1998 and hits like "Stomp to My Beat" and "Love Supreme", he gained the Finnish audience's attention. Furthermore, the single "Stomping System" also reached #6 on the UK Club Chart.

JS16 has also gained fame by being the producer of Finnish electro-hop group Bomfunk MC's, with three albums and the European hit "Freestyler" (2000). He has also produced international club anthems like "Sandstorm" and "Feel the Beat" with Finnish DJ Darude.

In 2002, he produced the JS16 Remix and the JS16 Dub of Britney Spears' hit single "Overprotected". His remix was also included on the soundtrack of Spears' 2002 film Crossroads.

Currently, JS16 is producing for the Finnish group Mighty 44. Additionally, he is a member of the group Dallas Superstars, alongside his countryman Bostik (aka Heikki Liimatainen). Their debut album was 2003's Flash, with hits like "I Feel Love" (reached #1 on Finnish and Swedish dance charts) and "Fast Driving", #4 on the UK Club Chart in the summer of 2004.

Discography

Albums
Studio albums
 Stomping System (1998)

Mix albums
 InTheMix (2000)
 Trancemania (2001)

Singles
As lead artist
 1991: "Hypnosynthesis"
 1992: "Untitled" (featuring Markku Lintula)
 1997: "Stomping System" (UK #76, Aug 1998)
 1997: "Stomp To My Beat"
 1999: "Love Supreme" (UK #77, Apr 1999)
 2007: "Rosegarden"
 2008: "Lights Go Wild"
 2012: "Hale Bopp" (with Orkidea)
 2014: "Girls On Film" (with Erkka)
 2019: "Don't Stop" (with Dex featuring Fiia)
 2020: "In The Spot" (with Stella Mwangi featuring B.O.W.)

As featured artist
 2009: Ola featuring JS16 - "PlayMe"
 2011: Pandora featuring JS16 - "You Woke My Heart"
 2016: Tom & Hills featuring JS16 - "Another Chance"
 2018: JES featuring Joonas Hahmo and JS16 - "The One"

Remixes
 2019: Camille Jones — "The Creeps" (JS16 Remix)

Video games
"Stomp to My Beat" by JS16 was featured in 9 releases of the Dance Dance Revolution arcade series, plus Dancing Stage EuroMix. The song is also available in Dance Dance Revolution 2ndReMix and Dance Dance Revolution Best Hits for the Japanese PlayStation, and in DDRMAX for the North American PlayStation 2.

A yellow check mark indicates that "Stomp to My Beat" is exclusive to Asian releases of ''Dance Dance Revolution A', with song being removed from that game on May 30, 2016.

References

External links

Darude official site
16 Inch Records official site
Dallas Superstars official site 

Video game musicians
Finnish trance musicians
Finnish record producers
1975 births
Living people